Tecpán is a town, with a population of 34,519 (2018 census), and a municipality in the department of Chimaltenango, in Guatemala, on the Inter-American Highway CA-1.

The climate is generally cold. It is characterized as a tourist destination, with some fame derived from its landscapes, varied vegetation and from being on an access route to Iximché archaeological site.

History 

Tecpán is known as the 'first capital of Guatemala,' based on it being the first permanent Spanish colonial military center of the nation, established in 1525. The first government capital settlement in colonial Guatemala, and its 'second capital', was Ciudad Vieja, established in 1527.

The fort was built here due to the difficulty that the Spanish had in defeating the Kaqchikel Maya during the Spanish conquest of Guatemala.

The remains of the Kaqchikel capital city, Iximché, are on a high hill only a few kilometers away from the city .

Demographics 
Tecpán currently is one of the larger municipalities in the nation, due to its far geographical reach to the northeast corner of its department, Chimaltenango. Its population is over 90% indigenous, mostly descendants of the Kaqchikel Maya.

Climate
Tecpán has a subtropical highland climate (Köppen: Cwb).

References

External links 
Official Municipality of Tecpán website—

Municipalities of the Chimaltenango Department
Colonial Guatemala
History of Guatemala City
Populated places established in 1525
1525 establishments in New Spain
16th century in Guatemala